The Jamiah Aishah Siddiqah Islamic Institute was located in Bowmanville, Ontario, Canada.  It was an Islamic School for Muslim girls. Located on a 105-acre campus, the Institute also offered full-time secular education until 12th Grade which was accredited by the Ontario Ministry of Education.

Education pattern
The following courses were offered to the students:
Tajweed and Qirat (Mastery over Quranic Recitation)
 Arabic Nahw (Grammar)
 Arabic Sarf (Morphology)
 Arabic Adab (Literature)
 Arabic Balaghah (Rhetoric)
 Mantiq (Logical, Rational, Deductive and Rhetorical Analytical Methods)
 Aqeedah (Islamic Doctrine and Theology)
 Usul al Fiqh (Principles of Islamic Jurisprudence)
 Fiqh (Jurisprudence)
 Usul al Hadeeth (Principles of Hadeeth Interpretation)
 Hadeeth (Prophetic Traditions)
 Usul al Tafsir (Principles of Exegesis of the Qur'an)
 Tafsir al Quran al Kareem (Exegesis of the Quran)
 Seerah (Biography of Muhammad)
 Meerath (Islamic inheritance)
 Islamic History
 Journalism
 Sociology
 Arabic Calligraphy
 Memorization of Select Surahs/Chapters

References

Deobandi Islamic universities and colleges